The Amherst Stadium is a 2,500-seat multi-purpose arena in Amherst, Nova Scotia, Canada.  It is home to the Amherst Ramblers Ice hockey team of the Maritime Junior Hockey League. The arena hosted the 1993 Centennial Cup.  It also hosts various minor hockey contests and trade shows every year.  The facility's  nickname is "The Jungle", and is known to many as one of the toughest buildings to win at when the Ramblers are playing. This rink is also known to have some of the most crazy fans because during the Ramblers games a few riots have ensued after or during the games usually ending in suspensions for the coaches and players and the fans getting kicked out of the arena for the rest of the game. The rink also holds host to the CCMHA minor hockey teams.

The rink in the arena measures 182 feet by 85 feet with the nets 11 feet from the end boards.

The arena also includes a heated room above ice surface that allows the handicapped and senior citizens to view of the hockey game.

References

External links
https://web.archive.org/web/20080517164534/http://www.freewebs.com/mjahl/amherst.htm

Indoor arenas in Nova Scotia
Indoor ice hockey venues in Canada
Sports venues in Nova Scotia
Buildings and structures in Cumberland County, Nova Scotia
Tourist attractions in Cumberland County, Nova Scotia
Amherst, Nova Scotia